Richard Antinucci (born January 26, 1981) is an American race car driver.

Career
In 1998 he competed in Italian Formula Ford, moving to the British Formula Renault Winter Series in 1999 and to Formula Renault 2000 Eurocup in 2000, where he stayed for one season (although he drove two fill-in races in 2001).

In a bad-tempered 2002 season, he moved to the Manor Motorsport team in British Formula 3, leaving them in 2003 for the Carlin team in the same series. Mid-season he changed to the rival Promatecme team, although he did not stay there long as he moved to Japanese Formula Three for the 2004 season.

Antinucci moved to the Formula Three Euroseries for 2005, and although finishing 19th overall in his first season, in 2006 he took several race wins on his way to 5th in the championship, and 2nd place at the end of season Macau Grand Prix, starting from 15th on the grid.

He drove in the Indy Pro Series in 2007 for Cheever Racing, driving for his uncle Eddie Cheever. Antinucci captured two wins and finished 15th in points despite only racing in the road course events, which accounted for 9 of the 16 races on the schedule. He signed with defending championship-winning team Sam Schmidt Motorsports for 2008. Antinucci won two races and was the runner-up to champion Raphael Matos at season end by 32 points.

Antinucci made his IndyCar Series debut on July 5, 2009 driving for Team 3G at Watkins Glen International.

Racing record

Career summary

Complete Formula 3 Euro Series results
(key) (Races in bold indicate pole position) (Races in italics indicate fastest lap)

American open–wheel racing results
(key) (Races in bold indicate pole position)

Indy Lights

IndyCar Series

References

1981 births
Living people
Indy Lights drivers
IndyCar Series drivers
Italian Formula Renault 2.0 drivers
British Formula Renault 2.0 drivers
Formula Renault Eurocup drivers
Formula 3 Euro Series drivers
British Formula Three Championship drivers
Japanese Formula 3 Championship drivers
Italian emigrants to the United States
World Series Formula V8 3.5 drivers
Racing drivers from Rome
American racing drivers
American people of Italian descent
WeatherTech SportsCar Championship drivers
Carlin racing drivers
Manor Motorsport drivers
GT World Challenge America drivers
Arrow McLaren SP drivers
Cheever Racing drivers
Victory Engineering drivers
JD Motorsport drivers
US RaceTronics drivers
OAK Racing drivers
Hitech Grand Prix drivers
TOM'S drivers
ART Grand Prix drivers